Alison Cree is a New Zealand herpetologist. She is currently a professor at Otago University.

Academic career 
Cree graduated from the University of Waikato in 1986 with a D.Phil. for her thesis titled "Water relations of the endemic New Zealand frogs Leiopelma archeyi, L. Hamiltoni and L. Hochstetteri".

Cree's work has been on a number of species, but her work with tuatara has attracted the most media attention.

Selected publications

Book

Journal articles

References

External links
 google scholar 
 institutional homepage

Living people
New Zealand women academics
New Zealand herpetologists
Women herpetologists
Academic staff of the University of Otago
Year of birth missing (living people)
21st-century New Zealand women scientists